Sinantolan, also known as ginataang santol or gulay na santol, is a Filipino dish made with grated santol fruit rinds, siling haba, shrimp paste (bagoong alamang), onion, garlic, and coconut cream. Meat or seafood are also commonly added, and a spicy version adds labuyo chilis. It originates from Southern Luzon, particularly from the Quezon, Laguna, and Bicol regions. It is a type of ginataan.

Names
Sinantolan (also sinantulan or santolan) means "done with santol".  It is also known as gulay na santol or gulayon na santol ("vegetable santol"), ginataang santol ("santol ginataan"), and giniling na santol ("ground santol").

Description
Sinantolan is made by first peeling the santol fruit and removing the seeds. The rind is washed and minced or grated into very small pieces. The juices of the grated rind are squeezed out to minimize the sour flavor. Garlic and onion is then sautéed in a pan for a few minutes along with the optional meat (either ground or cubed) or seafood. The santol rind is then added and cooked for a few minutes before coconut cream (kakang gata) is poured into the pan and allowed to boil until cooked. It is spiced with bagoong alamang, siling haba chilis, and salt and pepper to taste. For a spicier version, minced labuyo chilis may also be added.

Popular Sinantolan Brands
Sinantol ni Etelya

See also
Ginataang labong
Ginataang langka
Laing
Sinampalukan
Sinigang

References

Philippine cuisine